Octavia the Elder (died after 29 BC) was the daughter of the Roman governor and senator Gaius Octavius by his first wife, Ancharia. She was the elder half-sister to Octavia the Younger and Roman Emperor Augustus.

Biography

Early life 
Octavia was born to Ancharia and Octavius likely some time before 69 BC.

Marriage and issue 

Octavia the Elder was married to Sextus Appuleius (I). They had a son, who was also named Sextus Appuleius, he served as ordinary consul in 29 BC with his half-uncle, Augustus. It is postulated that they had a second son, Marcus Appuleius, the consul of 20 BC. Through Sextus Appuleius, the consul, she had a grandson named Sextus Appuleius, consul in AD 14, and a granddaughter Appuleia Varilla. Octavia the Elder's last known descendants were her great-grandson, also named Sextus Appuleius, through her grandson and Fabia Numantina.

Research 
Plutarch was only aware of one daughter of Gaius Octavius and confused Octavia the Elder with Octavia the Younger.

Octavia's existence as wife of Appuleius was first discovered due to a dedication from when her husband was proconsul of Asia.

Cultural depictions 
Octavia and her husband, as well as their two sons, may be depicted on the Ara Pacis.

See also 
 List of Roman women
 Women in ancient Rome

Notes

References

Sources 
 Herzog-Hauser, Gertrud: (Octavia 95). In: Realencyclopädie der Classischen Altertumswissenschaft, vol. XVII 2, col. 1858–1859.
 Suetonius; Life of Augustus
 Syme, Ronald; Augustan Aristocracy (Oxford University Press, 1989). ,

Further reading 
 

1st-century BC births
Year of death unknown
1st-century BC Roman women
1st-century BC Romans
Octavii Rufi
Family of Augustus